Heuilley may refer to the following communes in France:
 Heuilley-Cotton, in the Haute-Marne department
 Heuilley-le-Grand, in the Haute-Marne department
 Heuilley-sur-Saône, in the Côte-d'Or department